Biomarkers in Medicine is a monthly peer-reviewed medical journal established in 2007 and published by Future Medicine. The editors-in-chief are Andre Terzic (Mayo Clinic and Scott Waldman (Thomas Jefferson University). The journal covers all aspects of research on biomarkers.

Abstracting and indexing
The journal is abstracted and indexed in BIOSIS Previews, Biotechnology Citation Index, Chemical Abstracts, EMBASE/Excerpta Medica, Index Medicus/MEDLINE/PubMed, Science Citation Index Expanded, and Scopus. According to the Journal Citation Reports, the journal has a 2016 impact factor of 2.020, ranking it 77th out of 128 journals in the category "Medicine, Research & Experimental".

References

External links
 

English-language journals
Biochemistry journals
General medical journals
Publications established in 2007
Monthly journals
Future Science Group academic journals